OIII  (capital letter "O" followed by three capital "I"s) may refer to:
 Mehrabad International Airport, Tehran, Iran, ICAO designator
 OIII or O III, term for doubly ionized oxygen O++ in astronomy